Qashqadaryo is an urban-type settlement in Qashqadaryo Region, Uzbekistan. It is part of the city Qarshi. The population in 1989 was 4647 people.

References

Populated places in Qashqadaryo Region
Urban-type settlements in Uzbekistan